Endagabatan (Amharic: እንደገብጠን) also known as Enda Gabtan, Anda Gabtan, or Endagabton was a historical province of Ethiopia. Located north west of the old Fatagar region, bounded by Mugar, Gudar as well as Abay rivers. The region is in modern west Shewa province.

History
The region was likely under Ethiopian Christian control during Emperor Amda Seyon by the 14th century however it was contested by the Muslim Ifat Sultanate's Sabr ad-Din I. The region's inhabitants were mostly the now extinct Gafat people. Endagabatan was invaded by the Adal Sultanate under Ahmad ibn Ibrahim al-Ghazi in the middle of the sixteenth century. In 1563 the region was also the site of a rebellion led by Emperor Sarsa Dengel's cousin Hamalmal which is known as the Battle of Endagabatan. Modern day Endagabatan was incorporated into Shewa province in the 19th century.

See also
History of Ethiopia

References

History of Ethiopia
Provinces of Ethiopia